Makhuwa (Emakhuwa; also spelt Makua and Macua) is the primary Bantu language of northern Mozambique. It is spoken by 4 million Makua people, who live north of the Zambezi River, particularly in Nampula Province, which is virtually entirely ethnically Makua. It is the most widely spoken indigenous language of Mozambique.

Apart from the languages in the same group, eMakhuwa is distinguished from other Bantu languages by the loss of consonant + vowel prefixes in favour of e; compare epula, "rain", with Tswana pula.

Long and short vowels distinguish five vowel qualities /i e a o u/, which is unusually sparse for a Bantu language:

omala - to finish
omaala - to paste, stick
omela - to sprout, bud
omeela - to share out

The consonants are more complex: postalveolar tt and tth exist, both p and ph are used. Both x (English "sh") and h exist while x varies with s. Regionally, there are also θ (the "th" of English "thorn"), ð (the "th" of English "seethe"), z and ng. For instance in eLomwe, to which Makhuwa is closely related, the tt of eMakhuwa is represented by a "ch" as in English "church".

Phonology

Consonants

Vowels

Dialects
The names of the dialects vary in different sources. The shibboleth or distinctive variant in the dialects is the treatment of the s:

 eSamgagi dialect: odhiva
 eSangagi dialect: θtiva
 eSaaka dialect: ociva
 eNahara dialect: oziva - all meaning "agreeable, pleasant" 

Maho (2009) lists the following dialects:

 Central Makhuwa (3.1 million)
 Meetto (Metto) (1.3 million, including Ruvuma)
 Chirima (Shirima) (1.5 million, including subdialects Kokola, Lolo, Manyawa, Marenje, Takwane)
 Marrevone (Coastal Makhuwa; 460,000 including eNahara)
 eNahara (Naharra)
 eSaka (Saka, 210,000)
 Ruvuma Makhuwa (Tanzanian Makhuwa, including subdialects Imithupi, Ikorovere)

Mutual intelligibility between these is limited. Central Makhuwa ("Makhuwa-Makhuwana") is the basis of the standard language. Ethnologue lists Central Makhuwa, Meetto–Ruvuma, Marrevone–Enahara, and Esaka as separate languages, and Chirima as six languages.

The population figures are from Ethnologue for 2006. They tally 3.1 million speakers of Central Makhuwa and 3.5 million of the other varieties, though the Ethnologue article for Central Makhuwa covers Marrevone and Enahara, so these might be double counted.

Reading material in eMakhuwa

Muluku Onnalavuliha Àn'awe - Ipantte sikosolasiwe sa Biblia ("God speaks to his children" - extracts from the Scriptures for children) Aid to the Church in Need. Edição em Macúa / eMakhuwa) Editorial Verbo Divino, Estella, Navarra, 1997.

Sample text 
6 Moovirikana ni mamwene ale ootakhala, aakhala atthu akina yaawenrye woona ntata na Muluku, nnaamwi awo okathi mukina yaarina makhalelo mamosaru yaarina aya atthu ale akina aromoliwe.

Translation

6 In contrast with those wicked kings, others saw God’s hand, even though they were in the same situation as those mentioned above.

References

External links 

Oliver Kröger (2005),  Report on a Survey of Coastal Makua Dialects (SIL International)

 
Makua languages
Languages of Mozambique
Languages of Tanzania